Honigberg may refer to:
 Place name
Hărman, Saxon village in Braşov County, Romania
 Family name
Steven Honigberg (born 1962), American cellist
Bronislaw M. Honigberg (1920–1992), American zoologist

German exonyms
German-language surnames
Jewish surnames